...And It's Deep, Too! The Complete Warner Bros. Recordings (1968–1992) is a compilation of all of Richard Pryor's recordings with Warner Bros. Records. It contains material recorded between 1968 and 1992 and was released in 2000 through Rhino Entertainment.

The box set was re-issued in 2013 without the first and last discs as The Warner Bros. Albums (1974-1983).

Background
The collection includes a 76-page booklet, eight CDs released on Warner Bros. between 1968 and 1983, and a ninth CD of previously unreleased material. These albums include:

 Richard Pryor (1968)
 That Nigger's Crazy (1974)
 ...Is It Something I Said? (1975)
 Bicentennial Nigger (1976)
 Wanted/Richard Pryor - Live In Concert (1979)
 Live On The Sunset Strip (1982)
 Here And Now (1983)
 That "African-American" Is STILL Crazy: Good Shit From the Vaults ('70s, '80s, and '90s) (bonus CD)

Track listing

References

 "Richard Pryor." American Decades Gale Research, 1998; Reproduced in Biography Resource Center. Farmington Hills, Mich.: Thomson Gale. 2005.
 "Richard Pryor" in Shirelle Phillips (editor) Contemporary Black Biography, Volume 24 Reproduced in Biography Resource Center. Farmington Hills, Mich.: Thomson Gale. 2005.

Rhino Records compilation albums
Richard Pryor compilation albums
2000 compilation albums